This list of University of Phoenix alumni includes notable graduates.

Business

Government, law, and public policy

Journalism and media

Law Enforcement

Military

Sports

References

Notes 
 Blank cells indicate missing information.

External links 

 University of Phoenix Alumni Association

 
University of Phoenix alumni